Evilive II (also known as Evillive) is a 1998 live album by the American punk rock band Misfits. Featuring the "resurrected" Misfits lineup of vocalist Michale Graves, bassist Jerry Only, guitarist Doyle Wolfgang von Frankenstein, and drummer Dr. Chud, the album was recorded between October 1997 and March 1998 at a number of concerts in the United States. The album was released on CD by Caroline Records on August 14, 1998, and was made exclusively available through the official Misfits' fan club, known as "the Fiend Club", and was also sold on tour. The CD has since gone out-of-print.

The album's title is reminiscent of the title of the band's previous live album, Evilive, which was released in 1987. The cover artwork for Evilive II was created by artist Pushead.

Recording and release
The tracks for Evilive II were recorded live at various concert venues throughout the United States between October 31, 1997, and March 10, 1998. The album was released on CD by Caroline Records on August 14, 1998, and was made available to members of the official Misfits' fan club, known as "the Fiend Club", by mail order. The album was also sold on tour between 1998 and 2000. The cover artwork for the album was created by artist Pushead. The first 1,000 copies were mistakenly printed in blue ink, and all subsequent copies were printed in white ink as originally intended. The CD has since gone out-of-print.

Bootleg recordings of Evilive II on CD were available in Europe as early as 2005. The album was also bootlegged and released in Germany on LP records.

Track listing

Personnel

The Misfits
 Michale Graves – vocals
 Jerry Only – bass
 Doyle Wolfgang von Frankenstein – guitar
 Dr. Chud – drums

Personnel
 Dr. Chud – mixing
 John Smith – mastering
 Ian Heath – engineer
 Greg Mattison – engineer

Notes

References

Sources
 
 

Misfits (band) live albums
1998 live albums
Caroline Records live albums
Albums with cover art by Pushead